The 1972 United States Senate election in Alabama was held on November 7, 1972. 

Incumbent Senator John Sparkman was re-elected to a fifth term in office over Postmaster General Winton Blount.

Democratic primary

Candidates
 Melba Till Allen, Alabama State Auditor
 Sam Chestnut, Jr.
 Robert Edington, State Representative
 Jimmy Harper
 Lambert C. Mims, Mobile City Commissioner
 John Sparkman, incumbent Senator
 Charles Sullins

Results

Republican primary

Candidates
 Winton Blount, Postmaster General of the United States
 Doris B. Callahan
 James D. Martin, former U.S. Representative from Alabama's 7th congressional district
 Bert Nettles

Results

Independents and third parties

Alabama Conservative
 Herbert W. Stone

Alabama National Democratic
 John L. LeFlore, founder of Alabama NAACP and civil rights activist

Prohibition
 Jerome B. Couch, nominee for Governor in 1970

General election

Results

Results by county

See also 
 1972 United States Senate elections

Notes

References 

1972
Alabama
United States Senate